Padang food or Minang food is the cuisine of the Minangkabau people of West Sumatra, Indonesia. It is among the most popular cuisines in Maritime Southeast Asia. It is known across Indonesia as Masakan Padang (Padang cuisine, in English usually the simpler Padang food) after Padang, the capital city of Western Sumatra province. It is served in restaurants mostly owned by perantauan (migrating) Minangkabau people in Indonesian cities. Padang food is ubiquitous in Indonesian cities and is popular in neighboring Malaysia and Singapore. 

Padang food is famous for its use of coconut milk and spicy chili. Minang cuisine consists of three main elements: gulai (curry), lado (chili pepper) and bareh (rice). Among the cooking traditions in Indonesian cuisine, Minangkabau cuisine and most of Sumatran cuisine demonstrate Indian and Middle Eastern influences, with dishes cooked in curry sauce with coconut milk and the heavy use of spice mixtures.

Because most Minangkabau people are Muslims, Minangkabau cuisine follows halal dietary law rigorously. Most of its protein is taken from beef, chicken, water buffalo, goat, lamb, mutton, and poultry and fish. Minangkabau people are known for their fondness of cattle meat products including offal. Almost all the parts of cattle are used in Minangkabau dishes. Seafood is popular in coastal West Sumatran cities, and most are grilled or fried with spicy chili sauce or in curry gravy. Fish, shrimp, and cuttlefish are cooked in similar fashion. Most Minangkabau food is eaten with hot steamed rice or compressed rice such as katupek (ketupat). Vegetables are mostly boiled, such as boiled cassava leaf, or simmered in thin curry as side dishes, such as gulai of young jackfruit or cabbages.

Etymology
In popular usage prevalent in Indonesia and neighboring countries, the term "Padang food" is often used generally to refer to the culinary traditions of the Minangkabau people of Western Sumatra. However, this term is seldom used in Minangkabau inland cities itself, such as Bukittinggi, a culinary hotspot in West Sumatra, where they refer to it as "Minang cuisine" or "Minang food" instead. This is partly because many Minangkabau nagari (counties) take pride in their culinary legacies, and because there are differences between Padang rice of Padang and kapau rice of Bukittinggi.

Padang restaurants
In Padang food establishments, it is common to eat with one's hands. They usually provide kobokan, a bowl of tap water with a slice of lime in it to give a fresh scent. This water is used to wash one's hands before and after eating. If a customer does not want to eat with bare hands, it is acceptable to ask for a spoon and fork.

The food is usually cooked once per day. When eating nasi Padang (Padang rice) in restaurants, customers choose from various dishes which are left on display in high-stacked plates in the windows. In a dine-in hidang style Padang restaurant, after the customers are seated, they do not have to order. Rather, the waiter sets the table with dozens of small dishes filled with various dishes. Customers take only what they want from this array, and they pay only for what they take. The best known Padang dish is rendang, a spicy meat stew. Soto Padang (crispy beef in spicy soup) is commonly eaten for breakfast, while sate (beef satay in curry sauce served with ketupat) is served in the evening.

The serving style is different in nasi kapau food stalls, a Minangkabau Bukittinggi style. After the customer is seated, he or she orders specific dishes, which will be put directly upon the steamed rice or in separate small plates.

There are many Padang food establishments throughout Indonesia and surrounding countries, according to Ikatan Warung Padang Indonesia (Iwapin) or Warung Padang Bonds. In greater Jakarta alone there are at least 20,000 Padang restaurant establishments. Several notable Minangkabau restaurant chains are Sederhana, Garuda, Pagi Sore, Simpang Raya, Sari Ratu, Sari Minang, Salero Bagindo and Natrabu.

List of Padang foods

Dishes
The cooking method of gulai, which employing certain ingredients; meat, poultry, vegetables, fish or seafood simmered and slowly cooked in coconut milk, spice mixture and chili pepper, formed the backbone of Minangkabau cooking tradition. The thick golden, yellowish, succulent and spicy gulai sauce has become the hallmark of Padang restaurant's window display everywhere. In Padang, smart cooking means the capability of preparing gulai. Randang (beef simmered in coconut milk and spices), asam padeh (sour and spicy stew) and kalio (watery and light-colored gravy) are just a few variations of Padang gulai.

 Asam padeh, sour and spicy fish stew dish.
 Ayam bakar, grilled spicy chicken.
 Ayam balado, chicken in chili.
 Ayam bumbu, chicken with spices.
 Ayam goreng, fried chicken with spicy granules.
 Ayam lado ijo, chicken in green chili.
 Ayam pop, Padang style chicken, boiled/steamed and later fried. While fried chicken is golden brown, ayam pop is light-colored.
 Balado, chili paste similar to sambal with large sliced chili pepper, usually stir fried together with main ingredients.
 Baluik goreng, crispy fried small freshwater eel.
 Bubur kampiun, porridge made from rice flour mixed with brown sugar.
 Daun ubi tumbuk, cassava leaves in coconut milk.
 Dendeng, thinly sliced dried meat. 
 Dendeng balado, thin crispy beef with chili.
 Dendeng batokok, thin strips of pounded and softened grilled beef .
 Gulai, curry dish with main ingredients might be poultry, goat meat, beef, mutton, various kinds of offal, fish and seafood, and also vegetables such as cassava leaves and unripe jackfruit.
 Gulai ati, gulai of cow liver.
 Gulai ayam, chicken gulai.
 Gulai babek, gulai babat, or gulai paruik kabau, gulai of cow tripes.
 Gulai banak, gulai of cow brain.
 Gulai cancang, gulai of meats and cow internal organs.
 Gulai gajeboh, cow fat gulai.
 Gulai tambusu or gulai usus, gulai of cow intestines usually filled with eggs and tofu.
 Gulai itik, duck gulai.
 Gulai jariang, jengkol stinky bean gulai.
 Gulai kepala ikan, fish head gulai.
 Gulai kambiang, mutton gulai.
 Gulai kepala ikan kakap merah, red snapper's head gulai.
 Gulai limpo, gulai of cow spleen.
 Gulai sumsum, gulai of cow bone marrow.
 Gulai tunjang, gulai of cow foot tendons.
 Gulai talua, boiled eggs gulai.
 Gulai udang, shrimp gulai.
 Ikan bilih, fried small freshwater fish of the genus Mystacoleucus.
 Kalio, similar to rendang; while rendang is rather dry, kalio is watery and light-colored.
 Kepiting saus padang, seafood dish of crab served in hot and spicy Padang sauce.
 Ketupat, rice dumpling made from rice packed inside a diamond-shaped container of woven palm leaf pouch.
 Lele goreng, fried catfish.
 Lemang mixture of sticky rice, coconut milk and pandan in thin bamboo (talang).
 Martabak, stuffed pancake or pan-fried bread, sometimes filled with beef and scallions.
 Martabak kubang, Minangkabau-style of murtabak from Lima Puluh Kota Regency, West Sumatra. It is Arab–Indian–Minangkabau fusion dish.
 Nasi briyani, flavoured rice dish cooked or served with mutton, chicken, vegetable or fish curry.
 Nasi kapau, steamed rice topped with various choices of dishes originated from Bukittinggi, West Sumatra.
 Nasi kari or nasi gulai, rice and curry.
 Nasi padang, steamed rice served with various choices of pre-cooked dishes.
 Palai, Minangkabau variants of pepes.
 Paru goreng, fried cow lung.
 Pergedel jaguang, corn fritters.
 Petai goreng, fried green stinky bean (Parkia speciosa).
 Rajungan goreng, crispy fried crab.
 Rendang, chunks of beef stewed in spicy coconut milk and chili gravy, cooked well until dried. Other than beef, rendang ayam (chicken rendang), rendang itiak (duck rendang), rendang lokan (mussel rendang), and number of other varieties can be found.
 Roti canai, a thin unleavened bread with a flaky crust, fried on a skillet with oil and served with condiments or curry.
 Roti jala, the name is derived from the Malay word roti (bread) and jala (net). A special ladle with a five-hole perforation used to make the bread looks like a fish net. It is usually eaten as an accompaniment to a curried dish, or served as a sweet with serawa. Serawa is made from a mixture of boiled coconut milk, brown sugar and pandan leaves.
 Sambal lado tanak, sambal with coconut milk, anchovies, green stinky bean and spices.
 Sarikayo, jam made from a base of coconut milk, eggs and sugar.
 Satay, dish of seasoned, skewered and grilled meat, served with a sauce.
 Sate padang, Padang-style of satay, skewered barbecued meat with thick yellow sauce.  
 Soto, traditional soup mainly composed of broth, meat and vegetables.
 Soto padang, a soup of beef.
 Talua balado, egg in chili.
 Terong balado, eggplant in chili.
 Udang balado, shrimp in chili.

Snacks and desserts

 Galamai, sweets made of rice flour, palm sugar and coconut milk. This snack similar to dodol.
 Keripik balado, cassava cracker coated with hot and sweet chilli paste.
 Keripik sanjai, sliced cassava chips.
 Kerupuk jangek, cow's skin krupuk.
 Kue putu, traditional cylindrical-shaped and green-colored steamed cake.
 Peyek, deep-fried savoury crackers.
 Peyek udang, shrimp rempeyek.
 Pinyaram, traditional cake made from mixture of white sugar or palm sugar, white rice flour or black rice, and coconut milk.
 Roti tisu, thinner version of the traditional roti canai.
 Serabi, traditional pancake that is made from rice flour with coconut milk or shredded coconut.
 Tapai, fermented sticky rice. 
 Lopek sarikayo, sticky and chewy snack made from glutinous rice.
 Wajik, diamond-shaped compressed sweet glutinous rice cake.

Beverages
 
 Dadiah, fermented buffalo milk akin to yogurt.
 Es campur, cold and sweet dessert concoction of fruit cocktails, coconut, tapioca pearls, grass jellies, etc. and served in shaved ice, syrup and condensed milk.
 Es tebak, mixed of avocado, jack fruit, tebak, shredded and iced with sweet thick milk    
 Teh talua, mixture of tea and egg.
 Teh tarik, hot milk tea beverage.

In popular culture
 A task of The Amazing Race 21 requires a team member to balance several plates of hidang-style dishes to be delivered to a table of customers of a Padang restaurant in Surabaya.
 Indonesian film Tabula Rasa (2014), describes a Minang family which run a Rumah Makan Padang (Padang food restaurant) that hires an aspiring Papuan football player who struggles in Jakarta as their cook.

See also

 Indonesian cuisine
 Malay cuisine
 Javanese cuisine
 Sundanese cuisine
 Philippine cuisine
 Thai cuisine
Sri Owen, the primary interpreter of Indonesian cuisine to the English-speaking world, was born at the heart of Minangkabau culture

References

Indonesian cuisine-related lists